Dabbuki Lokam Dasoham is a 1973 Indian Telugu-language drama film, produced by M. Jagannatha Rao under the S.V.S. Films banner and directed by D. Yoganand. It stars N. T. Rama Rao, Jamuna and music composed by K. V. Mahadevan.

Plot
The film begins in a village where Sarpanch Dharma Rao is a tyrant. Ramu a resident is a well-informed youth who toils to enhance bigger life in his village and establishes a union. Plus, he impedes the enormities of Dharma Rao where animosity arises. Meanwhile, Aruna the nephew of Dharma Rao backs accomplishing her education and endears Ramu adoring his ideologies. However, Dharma Rao ruses to knit her with his debauch sibling Satyam to usurp the wealth. Ramu competes in the elections as backed by the village but in vain. Since Dharma Rao prevails with his financial strength. As of now, he forges Ramu as an impostor for furtively espousing a girl Lakshmi but Aruna trusts him. Following, the blackguards slay her and incriminate Ramu. Further, Satyam molests his sister Tulasi and she kills herself. 

In prison, Ramu befriends Lottery Babu & Race Raju. Once, Lottery segregates four tickets to his mates in which Ramu triumphs. Afterward, Race Raju & Lottery start up a business on behalf of Ramu which summits. Years roll by, and Ramu acquits when Race Raju & Lottery entrust the wealth which he refuses. Anyhow, he enrages & avenges society being aware of worse being harmed, and aims to teach a lesson. So, he lands at the village as a straw man and moves knaves at his fingertips when Aruna hostilities him. Parallelly, Ramu provides a great deal for the village via he creates a rift between the lowlifes and ceases them by divulging their evils. At last, Ramu proclaims A human should control the money, but not be a puppet in its hand when Aruna actualizes his virtue. Finally, the movie ends on a happy note with the marriage of Ramu & Aruna.

Cast
N. T. Rama Rao as Ramu
Jamuna as Aruna
S. V. Ranga Rao as President Dharma Rao
Relangi as Brahmananda Swamy 
Satyanarayana as Satyam
Allu Ramalingaiah  as Chalamaiah
Padmanabham as Lottery Babu 
Mikkilineni as Durgaiah 
Raavi Kondala Rao as Ekambaram 
Sakshi Ranga Rao as Kodandam
Rama Prabha as Chittithalli
Leela Rani as Lakshmi 
Vijaya Bhanu 
Y. Vijaya as Tulasi
Nirmalamma

Soundtrack

Music composed by K. V. Mahadevan.

References

Indian drama films
Films directed by D. Yoganand
Films scored by K. V. Mahadevan
1970s Telugu-language films
1973 drama films
1973 films